Siah Kalan (also Romanized as Sīāh Kalān, Sīah Kalān, Siyah Kalan, and Sīah Kalān; also known as Siahkuliān, Sīāh Kūlyān, and Siakh-Kulan) is a village in Ozomdel-e Shomali Rural District, in the Central District of Varzaqan County, East Azerbaijan Province, Iran. At the 2006 census, its population was 471, in 119 families.

References 

Towns and villages in Varzaqan County